Little Trees were a short-lived Danish teen pop girl group from Copenhagen. They are best known for their contribution to the 2001 animated film, Help! I'm a Fish soundtrack, for which they performed the title track, "Help! I'm a Fish (Little Yellow Fish)".

"Help! I'm a Fish (Little Yellow Fish)" was produced by Ole Evenrud, of A*Teens fame. Ole Evenrud also produced a similar-sounding version of the same song for the Danish duo, Creamy.

The trio consisted of Marie Brøbech, Stephanie Nguyen and Sofie Walburn Kring, who were 13, 14 and 15 years of age at the time, respectively. The girls had known each other since childhood and had been fixated on singing and dancing from the ages of 8–9. The producers of the original soundtrack for the movie Help I'm a Fish approached the girls with the title song, which they performed and toured with in Berlin and London (performing at Top of the Pops). Their song "Help I'm a Fish" gained triple platinum status in Scandinavia.

Discography

Singles

References

External links
Little Trees biography, news and discography at Bubblegum Dancer

Musical groups established in 2001
Musical groups disestablished in 2002
Danish pop music groups
Danish girl groups
English-language singers from Denmark